Mark Paul Frissora (born August 1955) is an American business executive. He has been the CEO and president of The Hertz Corporation, and was the CEO and president of Caesars Entertainment until 2019.

Prior to his July 2015 appointment as Caesars' CEO, he had spent his career working in various management positions for General Electric, Philips Lighting Company and Aeroquip-Vickers, as well as CEO and chairman of Tenneco and Hertz.

Frissora entered his role as CEO of Tenneco in 2000. Prior to stepping down in 2006, he was attributed to raising Tenneco's revenue by 39 percent for a total of $4.4 billion. Frissora subsequently joined The Hertz Corporation as CEO in 2006. On January 1, 2007 he became company chairman.

Frissora was named by Business Travel News as one of the most "Influential Business Travel Executives" of 2012. While holding his position at Hertz, Frissora was an active participant in international business groups including Business Roundtable, the World Economic Forum, McKinsey CEO Advisory Council, and the G100. Frissora was presented with the Oliver R. Grace Award for Distinguished Service in Advancing Cancer Research in 2012. He stepped down from Hertz in September 2014.

Early life and education
Frissora was born in August 1955 in Columbus, Ohio where he spent his childhood. He earned a B.A. from Ohio State University and later attended Babson College in Massachusetts. Frissora later enrolled in Thunderbird School of Management in Arizona where he studied executive development.

Career

Early management roles (1977–2000)
Frissora began his career in 1978 at General Electric. Throughout his time there, he gained experience in marketing, sales, and brand management. He remained with the company until 1987. In 1987 he moved on to Philips Lighting Company, where he served in multiple management roles. His positions included Director of Sales and Director of Marketing. He went on to Aeroquip-Vickers as Vice President from 1991-96.

In 1996, Frissora repositioned to Tenneco where he would again serve in several management positions. His initial role was VP of North American Emissions Control Operations for Walker Manufacturing. Frissora later served as Senior VP and General Manager of Tenneco's worldwide original equipment business from 1998 until March 1999. He was appointed as Tenneco's CEO and its President of Automotive Operations shortly thereafter in April. He joined Tenneco's Board of Directors, of which he was elected chairman, in March  of 2000.

The Press of Atlantic City alleged that Tenneco Automotive had been "circling the drain" and struggling with significant debt. The news source also reported Frissora was selected as CEO for his ability to "lean things out — for identifying process flaws by looking beyond the balance sheet to re-engineer what's actually happening on the ground at a company's plants."

Growth at Tenneco (2001–2006)

As CEO and chairman, Frissora targeted growth markets and sought to diversify revenue streams. By 2004 he had developed revenue boosting strategies in a number of platforms, logistics, customers, markets and product lines at Tenneco. Tenneco improved the market share positions for a number of its products.

However, in 2004, Tenneco earned a net income of $13 million, which represented a 52% drop from its 2003 figure. The company attributed this drop to restructuring changes and higher steel costs. The following year marked "the first time Tenneco put together two consecutive profitable years since the current configuration of the company was launched in 1999."

By February 2005, and since 1999, Tenneco's share price had tripled. Around that time the company earned two top Automotive Industry shareholder awards for delivering the highest one-year and three-year shareholder returns of any automotive supplier. By July 2006, Tenneco's revenue had risen 39 percent, or $4.4 billion, since 1999. The Press of Atlantic City attributed much of the success to Frissora noting his achievement as "honing in on strong sectors of the parts market — investing heavily in lucrative emission-control products; ramping-up operations in China's burgeoning auto market; and aligning Tenneco with Japanese carmakers, who were capturing a sizable share of North American auto sales."

Appointment to Hertz CEO (2006–2013)
In July 2006, Frissora accepted a position as CEO of The Hertz Corporation, a global American-headquartered car rental company, on the eve of the company's initial public offering (IPO). In January 2007, Frissora was subsequently appointed chairman. He oversaw the company through a number of major transitions.

That summer Hertz offered discounts on gasoline and other fees in order to make car rentals more customer-friendly and affordable. Frissora oversaw the acquisition of Donlen Corporation, a fleet leasing company, in 2011. In November of that year Hertz introduced ExpressRent kiosks, in what was the first large-scale deployment of live video chat in car rental kiosks.

Other strategic developments during Frissora's tenure included engineering Hertz's November 2012 acquisition of Dollar-Thrifty Automotive Group for $2.6 billion, after a two-year bidding war with Avis Budget Group. As part of the deal, Hertz also sold its low-cost Advantage brand, and gave up 29 Dollar Thrifty airport locations.

According to Reuters at the time, "the acquisition is expected to save the merged company at least $160 million annually and cement Hertz's No. 2 position in the global car rental rankings." Hertz's shareholder value increased significantly during this period, and by May 2013 Hertz had realized a return of 230% on their shares since going public.

Frissora credited both the Donlen and Dollar Thrifty acquisitions with enabling Hertz to broaden current market reach,  and providing exposure to new markets, via leasing, fleet management consulting, and managing fleet acquisitions and dispositions more efficiently.

Expansion of Hertz Corporation (2013–2014)
In May 2013, Frissora announced Hertz would relocate to Estero, Florida from New Jersey, with the new building to combine staff from both Dollar Thrifty and Hertz. The relocation was to be completed in 2016. By November 2013, Hertz was the "largest publicly traded rental car operator in the United States." Hertz stated revenue increases of 34 percent, and up to $10.8 billion, between 2006 and 2013.

By that time worldwide car rental revenues went up 37% and up to $8.7 billion; U.S. off-airport locations doubled, revenues increased by 45%, and the total number of locations increased from 7,600 to 11,200. In 2014 Reuters wrote that Frissora was "credited for the shrewd acquisitions that helped Hertz to grow into a $12.7 billion company - more than two-and-a-half times its value when it listed in 2006, shortly after Frissora took the helm."

In the summer of 2014, activist investors at Hertz asserted they lacked confidence in management due to reported "accounting mistakes and internal control issues". Consequently, activist investors pushed for board and management replacements including Frissora. Citing personal reasons, he resigned as CEO, chairman, and director on September 8, 2014. Frissora officially left the roles in November that same year. Hertz reported Frissora's departure was "without cause".

Appointment to Caesar's CEO (2015)

In February 2015, Caesars Entertainment Corporation announced Frissora would be replacing Gary Loveman as their new CEO and president, effective July 1, 2015. Frissora immediately joined the board and Loveman temporarily remained Caesars' chairman to help with the transition.

Although Caesars had been the world's largest casino company a decade earlier, the Wall Street Journal noted that by 2015 the company's revenues had suffered from a failure to expand sufficiently in burgeoning Asian markets, as well as incurring billions in debt amidst a 2008 buyout. Several weeks prior to Frissora's January appointment, the company's casino operating unit had voluntarily filed for reorganization through a Chapter 11 bankruptcy. Caesars Entertainment Corp. awarded its chief executive officer $29.4 million in compensation for 2017, the year the casino operator emerged from bankruptcy. Mark Frissora received a $2 million salary, $4.5 million cash bonus, $16.5 million in retention-restricted stock, a long-term cash award of $6 million and $400,000 for repriced options, the Las Vegas-based company said Tuesday in a regulatory filing.

As CEO designee from February to July 2015, Frissora stated he had "visited most of [Caesars'] domestic properties, met with all of the company's senior leaders" and focused on "identifying new opportunities to drive growth and efficiency." Thereafter, he joined the board of Caesars Entertainment Corporation and was appointed president and CEO of Caesars Enterprise Services (CES), as well as the CES Steering Committee.

On April 16, 2019, Caesars announced that Affinity Gaming CEO Anthony Rodio would be transitioning into the role of Caesars CEO within 30 days, replacing Frissora, who announced his intention to step down in November 2018.

Push for new gaming platforms (2016-2017)
After officially assuming position as of CEO and President of Caesars Entertainment in September 2015, the press quoted Frissora at the Global Gaming Expo stating he had been "shocked" with the lack of innovation in the casino industry at large, noting a lack of marketing that targeted millennials. At the conference he announced new experiments by Caesars to appeal to younger gamblers. One experiment in particular would include a "casino within a casino" on the Las Vegas Strip with interchangeable walls to change the feel of the space as needed.

Frissora added they would be pursuing "skill-based slots", recently legalized by the state of Nevada, and that the company was "experimenting with changing traditional slot machine playing by involving social game features such as leaderboards that track high-point players." Under Frissora's leadership, in November 2015, Caesars announced it would cede management of its Horseshoe Casino Cleveland, Horseshoe Casino Cincinnati, and ThistleDown Racino resorts to Rock Gaming, with the transfer to be completed by June 2016.

As of October 2016, Frissora continued focusing on bringing in new games that appeal to younger casino customers. According to The Economist, among other projects he "wants to open up their gaming platforms to allow young players to choose their games and compete against each other on the casino floor," with "skill-based" shoot-em-ups and "video-game gambling machines" from companies such as GameCo. In November 2016, Caesars Entertainment announced that it had "surpassed its Green Key Global certification goal" by having 90 percent, or thirty total, of its properties in North America be rated "4 Key" or higher in terms of sustainability. Frissora credited the rating to the company's "CodeGreen team", whom  initiated ways to reduce the resorts' environmental impact, and a "strong corporate commitment to sustainable practices."

Frissora rang the opening bell for Nasdaq in New York in October 2017. The press noted in October 2017 that Caesars was successfully recovering from its bankruptcy. Frissora outlined plans to investors to further franchise its brands with other partners, renovate rooms, introduce new entertainment and food, and also finish development on a convention center in Las Vegas, among other projects.

Non-executive board and council memberships
Frissora has been involved with a number of boards and organizations beyond his direct employers. In June 2002 he joined of the board of NCR Corporation, holding a directorship at NCR until November 2009. He became a director of FMC Corporation in January 2004, a role he held until August 2006. In December 2009, he became a director at both Delphi Automotive PLC, and Delphi Holdings LLP, also joining Delphi's finance committee and their nominating and governance committee. Furthermore, in December 2009 he became a director of Walgreens Boots Alliance, holding the position until April 1, 2015.

As a Walgreen Co. director, he was chairman of their finance committee as of 2014, as well as a member of their nominating and governance committee. He was chairman of Walgreens finance committee until he left the board in April 2015.

He has been a member of the Business Roundtable since before 2005, and is on the World Economic Forum's Automotive Board of Governors. He is also a member of the G100.

Recognition and awards
Frissora was named No. 5 on Business Travel News' list of the 25 Most Influential Business Travel Executives of 2012. In addition, he was presented with the 2012 Oliver R. Grace Award for Distinguished Service in Advancing Cancer Research by the Cancer Research Institute.

Personal life
Born and raised in Columbus, Ohio, Frissora is divorced, and has four children.

See also

 List of chief executive officers
 List of Ohio State University people
 List of people from Columbus, Ohio

References

External links
 

1955 births
Living people
American chairpersons of corporations
American chief executives
American people of Italian descent
Date of birth missing (living people)
20th-century American businesspeople
21st-century American businesspeople
Ohio State University alumni